Acalolepta iwahashii is a species of beetle in the family Cerambycidae. It was described by Hiroshi Makihara in 1992.

References

Acalolepta
Beetles described in 1992